Donje Dvorišće is a settlement in the Dugo Selo town of Zagreb County, Croatia. As of 2011 it had a population of 188 people.

References

Populated places in Zagreb County